François Denys Légitime (November 20, 1841 – July 29, 1935) was a Haitian general who served as President of Haiti from 1888 to 1889.

Biography 
Légitime was born in Jérémie, Haiti, on 20 November 1841 to Denys Légitime and Tinette Lespérance. Lespérance was a descendant of Modeste Testas, a formerly enslaved Ethiopian woman. Légitime married Rose-Marie Isaure Marion and had nine children: Cuvier, Edmond, Angèle, Antoinette, Denis Jr., Léon, Clemence, Marie, and Agnès.

He served as adjutant general during the government of Fabre Geffrard, and as aide-de-camp during the government of Sylvain Salnave. He was Secretary of State of the Interior and then Secretary of State of the Interior and of Agriculture during the government of Lysius Salomon. During this administration, Légitime was accused of aspiring to the presidency, and accordingly went to Kingston, Jamaica, remaining three years. He then returned to Haiti at the invitation of his followers, and on October 7, 1888, was elected president of the provisional government. General Seide Thelemaque denounced the election as fraudulent and attempted to make himself President, but he was killed in the battle which ensued. Légitime was elected President of Haiti on December 16, 1888, but resigned in 1889, owing to the opposition of General Florvil Hyppolite, and again retired to Jamaica. In 1896 President Tiresias Simon Sam granted a general amnesty, and Légitime returned to Haiti. He died on July 29, 1935 in Port-au-Prince.

References

Further reading
 Dumas, Pierre-Raymond. François Denys Légitime: un réformiste résolu (1841–1935), le général, président, auteur. Port-au-Prince: Imprimeur II (2007). .
 Histoire du gouvernement du général Légitime, président de la République d'Haiti. Paris : E. Leroux [Angers, A. Burdin et cie.] (1890). .
 Les États-Unis et le gouvernement du Gén. F.D. Légitime. New York: N. Thompson & acie (1889?). .
 Roche-Grellier. Quatre mois de ministère sous le gouvernement du général Légitime. Paris: A. Davy (1890). .
 Trouillot, Hénock. Démesvar Délorme: suivi de la pensée de François Dénis Légitime. Port-au-Prince: Ateliers Fardin (197-?). .

External links
 

Presidents of Haiti
Foreign Ministers of Haiti
1841 births
1935 deaths
People from Sud (department)
People from Grand'Anse (department)
1880s in Haiti
19th-century Haitian politicians
20th-century Haitian politicians
Haitian people of Ethiopian descent